Turki bin Saleh Al-Maliki (born 1974) is a member of the Department of Plans and Operations at the command of the Royal Saudi Air Force, and the spokesperson for the Arab Coalition Forces to Support Legitimacy in Yemen since 2017, succeeding Major General Ahmad Asiri, who was the head of the mission since the start of the military operations led by the Saudi Armed Forces, Operation Decisive Storm, and then Operation Restoring Hope in Yemen.

Biography
Turki Al-Maliki was born in Taif in 1974, and received his bachelor’s degree in air sciences from King Faisal Air Academy with distinction in 1997. He earned a master’s degree in military studies in 2015. Al-Malki undertook his studies in aviation at the American Naval Air Station in Pensacola, Florida, where he completed training in T-34, T-39 and T-2 aircraft.
He graduated in 2000 and worked at King Abdul Aziz Air Base on the F-15S aircraft in Dhahran, and at King Khalid Air Base in Khamis Mushait.

After that, he moved to work under the leadership of the Royal Saudi Air Force in the Plans and Operations Department and held several positions. During his military service, he took many courses, including: the foundation and advanced course on F-15S and courses in electronic warfare, airspace management, air operations planning, air defense operations, the squadron commanders course, the prevention course against weapons of mass destruction, in addition to courses in international humanitarian law on armed conflict.

On July 27, 2017, Colonel Turki Al-Maliki was appointed as the new spokesman for the Arab Coalition, succeeding Major General Ahmed Asiri, who was the head of the mission since the beginning of the military operation led by the Saudi Arabian Armed Forces in Yemen, the start of Operation Decisive Storm, and then Operation Restore Hope in Yemen.

References

People from Taif
Saudi Arabian military personnel of the Yemeni Civil War (2014–present)
Living people
1974 births
20th-century Saudi Arabian military personnel